Elk Grove High School may refer to:

 Elk Grove High School (Elk Grove, California)
 Elk Grove High School (Elk Grove Village, Illinois)

See also
 Grove High School (disambiguation)